My Queen Karo is a 2009 drama film. It was directed by Dorothée Van Den Berghe, produced by Frank Van Passel, and starring Matthias Schoenaerts, Déborah François, and Anna Franziska Jaeger. The film tells the story of Karo, a ten-year-old girl who witnesses the moral dilemmas of free love when her parents join a squatter community in 1970s Amsterdam. 

The film received three nominations at the 1st Magritte Awards.

Cast
 Anna Franziska Jaeger as Karo 
 Matthias Schoenaerts as Raven 
 Déborah François as Dalia 
 Rifka Lodeizen as Jacky 
 Maria Kraakman as Alice
 Hadewych Minis as Rosa 
 Nico Sturm as Barré 
 Ward Weemhoff as Joop
 Christelle Cornil as Anne Clare
 Bastiaan Rook as Kraker

Production
From the beginning, director Dorothée Van Den Berghe had chosen Anna Franziska Jaeger to play Karo, but the film took two years to put together, and by that time, she was too old for the part as she had written. "She had breasts already, and the part I had written was definitely for a child who was younger than that. So.. I held auditions and auditions, but I never found that quality, what I found in her. I rewrote the script, then, and we had to rethink how to shoot the nudity, for example, because of her breasts. But I think it puts the film into a better perspective, a child that age."

References

External links

2009 films
Dutch drama films
Belgian drama films
2009 drama films